Ana Marina Arismendi Dubinsky (born 30 May 1949, Montevideo) is an Uruguayan teacher and politician of the Communist Party. She served as Minister of Social Development from 2005 to 2010, and from 2015 to 2020, in the first and second government of President Tabaré Vázquez.

Biography 
Arismendi was born on May 30, 1949, as the daughter of Rodney Arismendi, a historic leader of the Communist Party and founder of the Broad Front, and Rosa Dubinsky.

In the early years of her adolescence she joined the Union of Communist Youth and the Committee of Support to the Cuban Revolution "Camilo Cienfuegos". 

During the civic-military dictatorship she went into exile to East Germany, where she obtained a Bachelor of Social Science.

Political career 
In 1990 she was elected member of the Central Committee of the Communist Party for its XXII Congress. She joined the Collective General Secretariat in 1992, and until 2006 she served as General Secretary of the party, after the resignation of Jaime Pérez. She was part of the Broad Front Political Board between 1992 and 1999.

In the 1994 general election, she was elected Senator. In the following elections, from 1999 and 2004 she was re-elected. In 2005, after Tabaré Vázquez assumed the position of President of Uruguay, she was appointed minister of the newly created Ministry of Social Development.

References

External links 
  Ministra Marina Arismendi
  Fundación Rodney Arismendi

See also

 List of political families#Uruguay

1949 births
Living people
Politicians from Montevideo
Uruguayan people of Basque descent
Uruguayan Jews
Jewish socialists
Communist Party of Uruguay politicians
Broad Front (Uruguay) politicians
Ministers of Social Development of Uruguay
Members of the Senate of Uruguay
Women government ministers of Uruguay
21st-century Uruguayan women politicians
21st-century Uruguayan politicians
Expatriates in East Germany